Collegiate Baseball League Europe (CBLE) is a wood bat summer collegiate league based in Oosterhout, the Netherlands.

The league currently consists of two divisions, the East Division (Vienna Emperors, Prague Dragons and Amsterdam Bombers) and the West Division (London Cavaliers, Sant Boi Falcons of Barcelona and La Rochelle Admirals). Players can apply individually and have the opportunity to choose their preferred division.
Each year the coaching staffs draft their team rosters from the list of registered players in the month of April. Players typically play their regular season at college teams in North America or with club teams in elite leagues across Europe.

History

The league was founded in 2012 and is based at Oosterhout in the Netherlands.

The inaugural tournament was held in July 2012 with 56 players from 10 different countries. All games were played at "Sportpark de Slotbosse Toren" in Oosterhout the Netherlands, home of the Dutch pro team Oosterhout Twins.

In 2014 the league expanded to baseball venues in London (GBR), Barcelona (ESP) and La Rochelle (FRA). As the only collegiate summer league in "the Old World", CBLE aims to offer players age 18-23 a great summer experience with high level baseball and a nice piece of Europe at the same time.

On April 17, 2014, CBLE announced an agreement with the Northwoods League to offer their top players the opportunity to play with the Elite College players in the US. The agreement between the two summer collegiate leagues is first of its kind.

In September 2014, 10 CBLE alumni represented 5 different countries at the European Baseball Championship in Germany and the Czech Republic. The game France vs. Belgium on September 16 featured former CBLE players Owen Ozanich (Falcons 2012) and Ben van Nuffel (Falcons 2013) as the starting pitchers for their country, while Axel Poesmans (Cavaliers 2014) was the starting catcher for Belgium.

In December 2014, CBLE announced it added venues in Vienna, Prague and Amsterdam to launch its East Division expansion in 2015, while London, Sant Boi Barcelona and La Rochelle will form the West Division. CBLE's hometown Oosterhout (NLD) will be the host of the EAST vs. WEST All Star game, the CBLE Championship Series playoffs and the Championship Game.

This is a list of the winningest CBLE franchise teams as measured in both total wins and winning percentage. The Sant Boi Barcelona Falcons lead all other teams with 33 wins. The remaining all-time win leaders in CBLE are the La Rochelle Admirals (29 wins), Praha Dragons (14), Amsterdam Bombers (13), Vienna Emperors (13), and London Cavaliers (11), respectively. In winning percentage, the all-time leaders in the CBLE are the Sant Boi Barcelona Falcons (.635), La Rochelle Admirals (.596), Vienna Emperors (.481), Praha Dragons (.467), Amsterdam Bombers (.406), and London Cavaliers (.344), respectively.

Teams

Regular-season champions and runners-up

 2017: SANT BOI FALCONS OF BARCELONA | LA ROCHELLE ADMIRALS
 2016: SANT BOI FALCONS OF BARCELONA | VIENNA EMPERORS
 2015: SANT BOI FALCONS OF BARCELONA | PRAHA DRAGONS

CBLE Championship Series champions and finalists

 2017: LA ROCHELLE ADMIRALS | AMSTERDAM BOMBERS
 2016: LA ROCHELLE ADMIRALS | SANT BOI FALCONS OF BARCELONA
 2015: SANT BOI FALCONS OF BARCELONA | PRAHA DRAGONS
 2014: LA ROCHELLE ADMIRALS | SANT BOI FALCONS OF BARCELONA
 2013: LA ROCHELLE ADMIRALS | SANT BOI FALCONS OF BARCELONA
 2012: SANT BOI FALCONS OF BARCELONA | LONDON CAVALIERS

Notable CBLE alumni
 Jesse Aussems (Kingdom of the Netherlands National Team)
 Stijn van der Meer (Kingdom of the Netherlands National Team)
 Owen Ozanich (French National Team)
 Mathew Smith (Adelaide Bite, Australian Baseball League)
 Quentin Becquey (French National Team)
 Oscar Combes (French National Team)
 Daniel Schmidt (Perth Heat, Australian Baseball League)

Contact 
 President: Jan Maarten Kops (NLD)

References

External links
 CBLE Official Website
 CBLE on Facebook
 Sant Boi Barcelona Falcons on Facebook
 Sant Boi Barcelona Falcons on Twitter
 AAU USA International Collegiate Baseball

Summer baseball leagues
Sports competitions in North Brabant
Sport in Oosterhout